Saffarin Madrasa is a madrasa in Fes el-Bali, the old medina quarter of Fez, Morocco. It was built in 1271 CE (670 AH) by the Marinid Sultan Abu Ya'qub Yusuf and was the first of many madrasas built by the Marinid dynasty during their reign. It is located just south of the 9th-century Qarawiyyin Mosque on Saffarin Square (or Place Seffarine), which is named after the coppersmiths who work in the square.

History

Role of madrasas in Fez 
Madrasas were a type of institution which originated in northeastern Iran by the early 11th century and was progressively adopted further west. These establishments served to train Islamic scholars, particularly in Islamic law and jurisprudence (fiqh). The madrasa in the Sunni world was generally antithetical to more "heterodox" religious doctrines, including the doctrine espoused by the Almohad dynasty. As such, it only took hold in Morocco under the Marinid dynasty which succeeded the Almohads. To the Marinids, madrasas played a part in bolstering the political legitimacy of their dynasty. They used this patronage to encourage the loyalty of Fes's influential but fiercely independent religious elites and also to portray themselves to the general population as protectors and promoters of orthodox Sunni Islam. The madrasas also served to train the scholars and elites who operated their state's bureaucracy.

The Saffarin Madrasa, along with other nearby madrasas like the al-Attarine and the Mesbahiyya, was built in close proximity to the al-Qarawiyyin, the main center of learning in Fes and historically the most important intellectual center of Morocco. The madrasas played a supporting role to the Qarawiyyin; unlike the mosque, they provided accommodations for students, particularly those coming from outside of Fes. Many of these students were poor, seeking sufficient education to gain a higher position in their home towns, and the madrasas provided them with basic necessities such as lodging and bread. However, the madrasas were also teaching institutions in their own right and offered their own courses, with some Islamic scholars making their reputation by teaching at certain madrasas. They also served as centers of their communities and hosted ceremonies.

History of the Saffarin Madrasa 

The Saffarin Madrasa was the first one of its kind to be built by the Marinids. It was completed in 1271 by commission of Sultan Abu Ya'qub Yusuf, who was also notable for his creation of Fes el-Jdid (the new citadel of Fez and capital of Morocco). Modern scholars view its layout and design as an early and not yet refined model of Marinid madrasas, which would be subsequently perfected in the madrasas of the early 14th century. Over the centuries, the madrasas in the area around the al-Qarawiyyin also became known for each housing students from particular regions of Morocco. Those staying at the Saffarin Madrasa were generally from nearby Zerhoun, from the northern region of Beni Zerwal, and from the southern region of Sous. In the 18th century the Mohammadia Madrasa was built next the Saffarin Madrasa as an annex to house more students. It covers an area of 752 square meters and also features two levels of rooms centered around a long courtyard.

In the 1930s and 1940s the Place Seffarin and many surrounding buildings were renovated. The adjoining Mohammadia Madrasa is also renovated and expanded on the initiative of Mohammed V between 1935 and 1942. By the late 20th century the madrasa was in a relatively dilapidated state and had lost much of its decoration, though it underwent some restoration in the 1960s. On the initiative of King Mohammed VI, it recently underwent a major restoration which was completed in 2016-2017 at the cost 8 million dirhams. The madrasa is still in use (both before and after the restoration) as housing for the students of the al-Qarawiyyin University.

Architecture

Layout 
The madrasa is entered via a bent passage which leads directly to a large rectangular main courtyard (sahn), at the center of which is a large rectangular water basin. Around this courtyard are a multitude of rooms which serve as sleeping quarters for the students, distributed across two stories. On the courtyard's eastern side, opposite the entrance, is a large high room which acted as a prayer hall (like a small mosque or oratory). The room is covered by a pyramidal roof and contains a mihrab (niche symbolizing the qibla or direction of prayer). However, because the alignment of the madrasa's street facade is different from the orientation of the qibla, the prayer hall is not aligned with the rest of the courtyard and stands at an angle to it. On the north side of the prayer hall (and following the same orientation), and reached via a long corridor from the corner of the main courtyard, is the madrasa's ablutions house. It consists of a smaller courtyard with a central water basin, around which are many small rooms containing latrines. Lastly, a small brick minaret stands next to the entrance.

Decoration 
The madrasa has lost most of its decoration, but parts of it have survived, especially in the prayer hall. These remains indicate that the madrasa once had carved stucco decoration around much of this room and the main courtyard, along with painted wood ceilings and zellij tilework. The small minaret is decorated with blind horseshoe arches around its windows and a band of simple polychrome ceramic tiles around its top, while its eastern facade is covered with a darj-wa-ktaf or interlacing arch motif.

Comparison with later madrasa architecture 
The madrasa presents some early features which reappeared in later Moroccan madrasas but is also different from the others in important respects due to it being one of the Marinid architects' earliest attempts to conceive of a purpose-built madrasa building (which did not yet have precedents in Morocco). Both the bent entrance and the central courtyard with a water basin were common features of later madrasas. However, the awkward arrangement of the prayer hall and other elements of the floor plan, as well as the fact that the sleeping quarters of the students opened directly onto the courtyard on the ground floor, are all aspects which were revised and not repeated in the design of later madrasas. The presence of a minaret was also not a feature of other madrasas (with the exception of the Bou Inania Madrasa which had the special status of a Friday mosque) seeing as the prayer hall of a madrasa was reserved for its students and was not open to the public like a full mosque. Jonathan Bloom, remarking that the minaret does not appear to be built from the ground level, suggests that it was likely added some time after the original construction of the madrasa.

See also 

 Sahrij Madrasa
 Grand Mosque of Fes el-Jdid (with information on the Madrasa of Fes el-Jdid, the next known madrasa to be built in Fes after the Saffarin Madrasa)

References

13th-century establishments in Africa
Buildings and structures in Fez, Morocco
Madrasas in Morocco
Marinid architecture